Michael Maloney (born 1950) is a Los Angeles-based art appraiser and art dealer. He owned and operated the Michael Maloney Gallery in Santa Monica, California (1985–90) and Maloney Fine Art in Culver City, California (2006–16), and since 1998 has pursued a career as an art appraiser and private dealer in Los Angeles and New York.
 
Maloney represented and exhibited a wide range of internationally established and then-emerging artists, including John Baldessari, Jean Michel Basquiat, Travis Collinson, Jeff Colson, Donald Judd, Roy Lichtenstein, Robert Mapplethorpe, Kim McCarty, Robert Motherwell, Joel Otterson, Ed Ruscha, Malick Sidibé and Andy Warhol. The two galleries and their exhibitions were written about in many publications, including the Los Angeles Times, Art in America, Artillery, LA Weekly, and Huffington Post, among others.

Life and career 
Maloney was born in 1950 in Los Angeles. After studying graphic design and illustration at ArtCenter College of Design in Pasadena, he moved to Boston and opened his first galleries, East End Gallery and West End Gallery (1980–5) in the seaside resort of Provincetown;  the galleries' summer-only programs focused on work by young Boston, New York and Los Angeles artists such as Jean Michel Basquiat, Francesco Clemente and Keith Haring, as well as established ones such as David Hockney, Jasper Johns, Robert Motherwell and Andy Warhol. During the winter months, Maloney worked for the Hokin Gallery in Palm Beach, Florida and Jan Turner Gallery in Los Angeles.
 
In 1985, he returned to California and opened the Michael Maloney Gallery in Santa Monica, which remained open until early 1991. During the 1990s, Maloney pursued work in New York (including with Gagosian Gallery) and Los Angeles as a private art dealer and curator, before establishing himself as an art appraiser and Director of 20th Century Art for Butterfield & Butterfield Auctioneers (now Bonhams) in California in 1998. Since that time, he has worked as an independent appraiser, and in 2006, opened Maloney Fine Art in Culver City, California, which operated through 2016. Since 2007, Maloney has contributed to "Angel Art," an annual art auction that has raised over $10 million for the nonprofit, Project Angel Food, which provides meals for men, women and children suffering from life-threatening illnesses.

Michael Maloney Gallery 
Maloney opened the Michael Maloney Gallery in 1985, operating as owner and director in the burgeoning gallery districts that developed in the city at the time. He offered a mixed program of established and emerging artists, with work ranging from collage-like lithographs by Robert Motherwell and postmodern, multi-image triptychs by John Baldessari, to the quirky, quasi-naive paintings and diminutive, minimal wall sculptures of younger New Yorkers Joe Andoe and Catherine Lee, respectively, to small surveys of Andy Warhol's work. Other artists that the gallery exhibited include Sam Francis, Roy Lichtenstein and Robert Rauschenberg, and then-emerging figures such as Jean Michel Basquiat, Ross Bleckner, Sandro Chia, Francesco Clemente, Robert Mapplethorpe and Joel Peter Witkin, among others.
 
In early 1991, like many others in Santa Monica, Maloney closed his gallery in the face of a prolonged economic downturn and art market slump in order to pursue private dealing.

Maloney Fine Art 
Maloney opened Maloney Fine Art in 2006, operating again as owner and director in an intimate space in Culver City, California. He adopted a similar program mixing established and emerging artists, which often played out in eclectic group exhibitions, such as a 2009's "Blue Blue," which featured works in blue by artists as diverse as Yves Klein, Catherine Opie and Kim Dingle, or a 2014 show of Mike Kelley, Raymond Pettibon and Ed Ruscha, which LA Weekly'''s Catherine Wagley compared to "a psychedelia-meets-grunge mixtape [that] might remind you of times when your mind was blown." The 2013 exhibition, "Fire in Her Belly," featured sociopolitical work centered on dissent and censorship by artists including ACT UP, Andres Serrano, Annie Sprinkle, Ai Weiwei, and David Wojnarowicz.Claire Trevor School of the Arts, "Martabel Wasserman Curates Show at Maloney Fine Art", News, University of California Irvine, 2013. Accessed April 28, 2020.
 
Other well-covered exhibitions included: Joel Otterson's thrift-shop object assemblages ("Chandelier Queer," 2013) and decorative glass and sewn works ("Needleworks," 2015);Eve Wood, "Joel Otterson at Maloney Fine Art," Artillery, December 11, 2013. Accessed April 28, 2020.Hammer Museum, "Hammer Highlights 2017: Recent Acquisitions", December 20, 2017. Accessed April 28, 2020. Jeff Colson's trompe l’oeil sculpture of an overflowing garage (Roll Up, 2014) and absurdist ode to paper (Stacks'', 2015); the spare, oblique portraits of Travis Collinson and wet-into-wet watercolors of Kim McCarty; Millie Wilson's interrogation of gender stereotypes through vernacular, found photographs, presented in small light boxes; and a 40-year survey of Malick Sidibé's matter-of-fact, black-and-white portraits in the wake of Mali's independence in 1960.

Maloney carried over many artists from his previous gallery; some of the additional artists that he exhibited include established names, such as Diane Arbus, George Condo, Donald Judd, and Hiroshi Sugimoto, and emerging or lesser-known artists, such as Ford Beckman, Danny First, Anthony James, Masood Kamandy, Maberry + Walker, Yassi Mazandi, Jorge Pardo, Augusto Sandroni, George Stoll, and John Tottenham, among others.

In the beginning of 2017, Maloney decided to shutter the gallery in order to fully focus on his appraisal business; art writers cited the move (and other closings in the area) as symptomatic of a declining art market for galleries caused by a lack of new, younger collectors and auctions cutting into sales.

Art appraisal 
Maloney has worked as an art appraiser for more than twenty years, specializing in 20th and 21st century modern and contemporary paintings, prints, photographs and art installations; he is certified by the Appraisers Association of America and earned a USPAP (Uniform Standards of Professional Appraisal Practice) certificate in 2008 from New York University. He began in 1997 with Butterfield & Butterfield Auctioneers (Bonhams) in California, and since 2000, has worked independently in Los Angeles for many of the region's prominent private collectors, museums and other arts institutions.

References

External links 
Maloney Art Appraisals official website

American art dealers
People from Los Angeles
1950 births
Living people